The Journal of Cellular Biochemistry publishes descriptions of original research in which complex cellular, pathogenic, clinical, or animal model systems are studied by biochemical, molecular, genetic, epigenetic, or quantitative ultrastructural approaches.

History 
The journal was previously called the Journal of Supramolecular Structure (1972–1980) and the Journal of Supramolecular Structure and Cellular Biochemistry (1981).

Abstracting and indexing 
The Journal of Cellular Biochemistry is indexed and/or abstracted in the following databases: BIOBASE, Biochemistry and Biophysics Citation Index, Biological Abstracts, BIOSIS Previews, CAB Abstracts, Cambridge Scientific Abstracts, Chemical Abstracts Service/SciFinder, CSA Biological Sciences Database, Current Awareness in Biological Sciences, Current Contents/Life Sciences, EMBASE, EORTC Database, Index Medicus/MEDLINE/PubMed, Reference Update, Science Citation Index, and Scopus.

References 

Biochemistry journals
Molecular and cellular biology journals
Publications established in 1972